Stratellite is a brand name trademark of Sanswire for a future emissions-free, high-altitude stratospheric airship that provides a stationary communications platform for various types of wireless signals usually carried by communications towers or satellites. The Stratellite is a concept that has undergone several years of research and development, and is not yet commercially available; Sanswire, with its partner TAO Technologies, anticipates its current testing sequence to include the launch of a Stratellite into the stratosphere.

Details

High-altitude airships, like the Stratellite, would hover lower than an orbiting satellite, but far above the jet stream and most weather, in the stratosphere approximately 13 mi (20 km) above the Earth. A single unit could then send broadband, mobile phone and digital television and radio signals to a large area.
The unmanned Stratellite would be powered by solar cells and propelled by electric motors.  So far, this technology remains unproven, and is very far from commercialization. A working proto-type that can perform all these functions doesn't exist.

Lag times would be reduced by a factor of nearly 2000 compared to geosynchronous satellites, and 15 for low orbiting satellites but with a smaller coverage area. When compared to terrestrial communications towers, Stratellite coverage would be larger, with lag times being more a function of internal communications equipment rather than distance.

Estimated broadband coverage of 300,000 mi2 (480,000 km2), roughly the size of Texas or France, is planned. Wireless signals could be transmitted to and from a 200 mi (320 km) diameter, but terrain features and man-made structures could partially or locally interfere with the signal. Since the Stratellite is designed for regular returns to the surface for maintenance, some overlap and redundancy would be required to maintain continuous service.  Sanswire Networks initially plans to deploy this technology over major metropolitan areas.

Proponents claim a high-altitude communications platform, like the Stratellite, could make terrestrial broadcast towers obsolete, reducing the cost and time required for hardware updates. An update made to a single unit would effectively cascade to an entire grid of virtual broadcast towers. It will be possible to bring broadband service to a wide area currently without terrestrial towers quickly and with relative ease.

Company details
According to corporate press releases, the Stratellite and related assets were shipped to TAO Technologies in Stuttgart, Germany for further evaluation and design revision.  Sanswire then formed a new German corporation known as Sanswire-TAO GmbH. 

Sanswire is not the first company to propose such a craft.  Similar proposals have been made by Advanced Technologies Group (ATG) in Bedford, England, SkyLINK, Inc, in England, and SkyTower Inc., a subsidiary of AeroVironment Inc. in Monrovia, California, in the United States.

Prior to September 25, 2008, Sanswire was previously known as GlobeTel Communications Corp.

On October 17, 2012, the U.S. District Court for the Southern District of Florida granted the U.S. Securities and Exchange Commission's motions for over US$3 million Remedies, and granted Motions For Disgorgement, Civil Penalties and Officer-And-Director Bars Against Timothy Huff, Lawrence Lynch, Joseph J. Monterosso, Luis Vargas.

Starting in November 2007, the Securities and Exchange Commission brought civil actions against the defendants in connection with GlobeTel Communications Corp., now World Surveillance Group Inc. (GlobeTel). GlobeTel reported millions of dollars in telecommunications revenue from 2002 to 2006 that the Commission alleged was fake. Huff and former GlobeTel chief financial officer Thomas Jimenez were sentenced to prison as a result of parallel criminal prosecutions. See U.S. v. Huff, 09-cr-60295-DMM (S.D. Fla.); U.S. v. Jimenez, 08-cr-60367-DTKH (S.D. Fla.). GlobeTel and Jimenez previously consented to the entry of judgments against them in the Securities and Exchange Commission's action.

The district court adopted a recommendation previously entered by a magistrate judge and ordered the following remedies:

Former GlobeTel Communications (GlobeTel) chief executive officer Timothy Huff to pay a $1.21 million penalty and $1.5 million in disgorgement plus prejudgment interest. Judge Joan A. Lenard calculated Huff's penalty by imposing a third-tier penalty for each of Huff's 10 most-serious false disclosures. She also ordered him to disgorge the full $1.5 million that he received when he exercised stock options in the midst of the fraud.

Former GlobeTel chief financial officer Lawrence Lynch to pay a $780,000 civil penalty.

Former GlobeTel former executive Joseph J. Monterosso to pay a $300,000 penalty and $675,000 in disgorgement plus prejudgment interest (joint-and-severable with Luis Vargas) and Monterosso barred from serving as an officer or director of a public company for 10 years.

Former GlobeTel employee Luis Vargas to pay a $150,000 penalty and $675,000 in disgorgement plus prejudgment interest (joint-and-severable with Joseph J. Monterosso) and Vargas barred from serving as an officer or director of a public company for 10 years.

Specifications

References

External links
 German Stratellite WiKi Site
 QucomHaps, HAPS using Stratospheric Aircraft

Airship configurations